Charles Howard Ellis (9 August 1830 – 17 January 1880) was an English cricketer active from 1856 to 1868 who played for Sussex. He was born in Ditchling and died in Brighton. He appeared in 80 first-class matches as a righthanded batsman who bowled underarm. He scored 1,812 runs with a highest score of 83 and took 100 wickets with a best performance of eight for 96.

Notes

1830 births
1880 deaths
English cricketers
Sussex cricketers
Non-international England cricketers
Married v Single cricketers
North v South cricketers
Gentlemen v Players
Players of the South cricketers
People from Ditchling